MDF may refer to:

Computing 
 Master Database File, a Microsoft SQL Server file type
 MES Development Framework, a .NET framework for building manufacturing execution system applications
 Message Development Framework, a collection of models, methods and tools used by Health Level 7 v3.0 methodology
 Media Descriptor File, a proprietary disc image file format developed for Alcohol 120%
 Measurement Data Format, one of the data formats defined by the Association for Standardisation of Automation and Measuring Systems (ASAM)
 Multiple Domain Facility; see Logical partition

Medicine 
 Map-dot-fingerprint dystrophy, a genetic disease affecting the cornea
 Mean Diastolic Filling of the heart
 Myocardial depressant factor, a low-molecular-weight peptide released from the pancreas into the blood in mammals during various shock states

Organizations 
 Hungarian Democratic Forum (Hungarian: Magyar Demokrata Fórum), a political party
 Maraland Democratic Front, a political party in Mizoram, WALES
 Maryland Defense Force, the state defense force of Maryland
 Moscow House of Photography
 Myotonic Dystrophy Foundation, a U.S. non-profit organization related to myotonic dystrophy

Telecommunication 
 Main distribution frame, a distribution frame where cables are cross-connected in telephony
 Multidelay block frequency domain adaptive filter

Other uses 
 Made cut did not finish, a golf term
 Market development funds
 Maryland Deathfest
 Moksha language
 Medium-density fibreboard, a type of particle board made of small particles of wood